In mathematics, a functional square root (sometimes called a half iterate) is a square root of a function with respect to the operation of function composition. In other words, a functional square root of a function  is a function  satisfying  for all .

Notation  

History
The functional square root of the exponential function (now known as a half-exponential function) was studied by Hellmuth Kneser in 1950.
Babbage noted that for any given solution , its functional conjugate  by an arbitrary invertible function  is also a solution. In other words, the group of all invertible functions on the real line acts on the subset consisting of solutions to Babbage's functional equation by conjugation.

Solutions

A systematic procedure to produce arbitrary functional -roots (including arbitrary real, negative, and infinitesimal ) of functions  relies on the solutions of Schröder's equation. Infinitely many trivial solutions exist when the domain of a root function f is allowed to be sufficiently larger than that of g.

Examples

 [red curve]
 [blue curve]
 [orange curve]
 [black curve above the orange curve]
 [dashed curve]

(See. For the notation, see .)

See also

Iterated function
Function composition
Abel equation
Schröder's equation
Flow (mathematics)
Superfunction
Fractional calculus
Half-exponential function

References

Functional analysis
Functional equations